In the Studio with Redbeard is a North American radio program, produced and hosted by Dallas, Texas, based rock and roll disc jockey Doug "Redbeard" Hill.

The show is a weekly hour-long "rockumentary" interview with music program which looks at the making of many of the greatest albums recorded in rock and roll history, although sometimes it would spotlight the history of rock and roll bands. Redbeard interviews the musicians who created these albums.

The show first went on the air nationally the week of June 26, 1988, initially broadcast by 60 rock stations including WXRK/92.3: New York, KLOS/95.5: Los Angeles, WLUP-FM/97.9: Chicago, WMMR/93.3: Philadelphia, KTXQ/102.1: Dallas, WHJY/94.1: Providence, WRIF/101.1: Detroit, KRQR: San Francisco, WKLS: Atlanta and distributed by The Album Network through 1999, which grew the network to 180 stations. "In the Studio" is now in its 30th consecutive year, having passed the 1,200-show mark in June 2011, and is distributed by Beardedfisch Productions. Now has the episodes online at its website with or without the music.

Artists and albums featured over the years
 Show #6: August 1, 1988: The Doors "The Doors"
 Show #7: August 8, 1988: Pink Floyd "The Dark Side of the Moon"
 Show #34: February 13, 1989: The Byrds
 Show #70: October 23, 1989: Peter Frampton "Frampton Comes Alive"
 Show #80-2 March 22, 1993 - Pink Floyd - 20th Anniversary of "The Dark Side of the Moon"
 Show #106: Don Henley "Building The Perfect Beast"
 Show #114: Little Feat "Waiting For Columbus"
 Show #115: J. Geils Band "Freeze Frame"
 Show #130: Elton John "Goodbye Yellow Brick Road"
 Show 136: Peter Frampton "Frampton Comes Alive"
 Show 141: Loverboy "Get Lucky"
 Show #147: Heart "Little Queen/Dog & Butterfly"
 Show #157: Huey Lewis & The News "Sports"
 Show #158: Paul McCartney "Tripping The Live Fantastic"
 Show #160: Foreigner "Double Vision"
 Show #161: Santana "Abraxas"
 Show #164: Grand Funk "Closer To Home"
 Show #165: Tom Petty "Damn The Torpedoes"
 Show #168: Genesis "Duke/Abacab"
 Show #169: Procol Harum "Best of"
 Show #171: Moody Blues "Seventh Sojourn"
 Show #172: Kansas "Leftoverture"
 Show #173: Lynyrd Skynyrd "Street Survivors"
 Show #174: Humble Pie "Rockin' The Fillmore"
 Show #178: Bob Seger "Night Moves"
 Show #179: Journey "Infinity"
 Show #185: Eddie Money "Can't Hold Back/Nothing To Lose"
 Show #189: Jefferson Airplane "Surrealistic Pillow"
 Show #191: Todd Rundgren "Something/Anything"
 Show #192: Fleetwood Mac "Rumors"
 Show #197: James Gang "Rides Again"
 Show #198: Guess Who "Best of"
 Show #201: Steve Miller Band "Book of Dreams"
 Show #217: George Harrison "Live In Japan" part 1
 Show #218: George Harrison "Live In Japan" part 2
 Show #240: Bob Seger "Against The Wind"
 Show #256: Bob Seger "Stranger In Town""
 Show #396: January 26, 1996: R.E.M. "Out of Time"
 Show #402: March 4, 1996: Heart "Dreamboat Annie"
 Show #420: July 8, 1996: Sammy Hagar "Unboxed (Best of)"
 Show #438: November 11, 1996: Grateful Dead "The Arista Years" Part 1, with Bob Weir, Phil Lesh, and Mickey Hart
 Show #439: November 18, 1996: Grateful Dead "The Arista Years" Part 2, with Bob Weir, Phil Lesh, and Mickey Hart
 Show #453: February 24, 1997: Fleetwood Mac "Rumours" 20th Anniversary
 Show #476: August 4, 1997: R.E.M. "Document" 10th Anniversary
 Show #480: September 1, 1997: Steely Dan "Aja" 20th Anniversary
 Show #487: October 20, 1997: Steely Dan "Can't Buy A Thrill" 25th Anniversary
 Show #559: March 8, 1999: Bad Company "Desolation Angels"
38 Special- Wild-Eyed Southern Boys/Special Forces (one episode). Features interviews with Donnie Van Zandt and Jeff Carlisi.
AC/DC - High Voltage (the initial episode aired in 1997 also spotlighted on the box set Bonfire and in 2006 for its 30th anniversary episode also spotlighted Dirty Deeds Done Dirt Cheap), Let There Be Rock/Highway to Hell (one episode), Back in Black and Rock 'N Roll Train (a 2-part history on AC/DC to promote their Black Ice album). Interviews were with Angus Young and Malcolm Young. Back in Black and Rock 'N Roll Train had interviews with the Young brothers and Brian Johnson.
Bryan Adams - Cuts Like a Knife, Reckless, Waking Up the Neighbours, So Far So Good (which would be re-aired as Anthology).
Aerosmith - Aerosmith/Get Your Wings, Toys in the Attic, Rocks, Permanent Vacation, Pump and Get a Grip. Interviews with Tom Hamilton, Brad Whitford, Joey Kramer, Joe Perry and Steven Tyler.
The Allman Brothers Band - The Allman Brothers Band/Idlewild South (one episode), At Fillmore East and Eat a Peach. Interviews with Gregg Allman and Dickey Betts.
Ian Anderson - Thick As a Brick 2. Interview with Ian Anderson.
Asia - Asia. Interviews with Carl Palmer, John Wetton and Geoff Downes.
Bad Company - Bad Company, Straight Shooter, Desolation Angels and The 'Original' Bad Co. Anthology. The first album and Straight Shooter feature interviews with Simon Kirke and Mick Ralphs. Desolation Angels, The 'Original' Bad Co. Anthology and subsequent anniversary specials of the first two albums also include interviews with Paul Rodgers.
The Band - The Brown Album. Includes interviews with Robbie Robertson.
The Beatles - The White Album (2-part episode), best of The Beatles, The Beatles Stereo Box Set (two-part episode) and 1 (The Beatles album) (2-part episode). All featured interviews with Paul McCartney and George Harrison.
Pat Benatar - Crimes of Passion and Precious Time. Both episodes feature interviews with Benatar and Neil Giraldo.
The Black Crowes - Shake Your Moneymaker and The Southern Harmony and Musical Companion. Includes interviews with Chris Robinson and Rich Robinson.
Black Sabbath - Black Sabbath/Paranoid/ Master of Reality/Black Sabbath Vol. 4 (would be re-aired as Symptom of the Universe: The Original Black Sabbath 1970–1978 in conjunction with Black Sabbath's 2006 induction into The Rock and Roll Hall of Fame and again in 2010 in conjunction with Paranoid's 40th Anniversary). Interviews with Ozzy Osbourne. Separate episodes would be made for Paranoid and Black Sabbath Volume 4 for their 40th Anniversaries in 2010 and 2012 respectively.
Bon Jovi - Slippery When Wet and New Jersey. Both episodes feature interviews with Jon Bon Jovi and Richie Sambora.
Boston - Boston, Don't Look Back and Third Stage. These episodes all have interviews with Tom Scholz except for Boston's debut which has Scholz and Brad Delp interviewed.
David Bowie - The Rise and Fall of Ziggy Stardust and the Spiders from Mars, Young Americans, Station to Station, Let's Dance, The Best of Bowie and David Live/Stage (one episode). All episodes feature interviews with Bowie.
Jackson Browne - Running on Empty and The Very Best of Jackson Browne (2-part). It includes interviews with Browne.
Lindsey Buckingham - The Best of Lindsey Buckingham (2-part episode). It includes interviews with Buckingham.
The Cars - The Cars self-titled debut, Candy-O, Shake it Up, Heartbeat City and Moving in Stereo : The Very Best of The Cars. Both featured interviews with Ric Ocasek while Candy-O, the 40th Anniversary of the self titled debut and Heartbeat City also featured interviews with Greg Hawkes.
Cheap Trick - Cheap Trick at Budokan and The Essential Cheap Trick (2-part) (in honor of the band's induction into The Rock and Roll Hall of Fame). Both featured interviews with Rick Nielsen and Robin Zander.
Chicago - The Chicago Transit Authority, Chicago II and Chicago V/Chicago VI/Chicago VII (one episode). Features interviews with Robert Lamm.
Eric Clapton - 24 Nights (2-part episode) and Clapton Chronicles (2-part episode). Features interviews with Clapton.
Joe Cocker - Mad Dogs and Englishmen. Features interviews with Joe Cocker and Leon Russell.
Phil Collins - Face Value, Hello, I Must Be Going! and No Jacket Required. Features interviews with Phil Collins.
Alice Cooper - Love It to Death/Killer (one episode), Billion Dollar Babies and The Best of Alice Cooper. Feature interviews with Alice Cooper.
Cream - Disraeli Gears/Wheels of Fire (one episode) and Royal Albert Hall London May 2-3-5-6 2005. Both episodes include interviews with Jack Bruce. Royal Albert Hall and 40th/45th Anniversary episodes of Disraeli Gears also includes interviews with Eric Clapton.
Creedence Clearwater Revival - Green River/Bayou Country/Willy and the Poor Boys (one episode) and Cosmo's Factory. Includes interviews with John Fogerty.
Crosby, Stills & Nash - self-titled. Includes interviews with Graham Nash, David Crosby and Stephen Stills.
Crosby, Stills, Nash & Young - Déjà Vu. Includes interviews with David Crosby, Stephen Stills and Neil Young.
Deep Purple - Machine Head and Shades: 1968–2000 (2 part episode). Features interviews with Ian Gillan, Roger Glover and David Coverdale (for Shades only).
Def Leppard - Pyromania, Hysteria and Yeah!. All episodes feature interviews with Joe Elliott and Rick Savage. Pyromania and Yeah! also features interviews with Phil Collen.
Dire Straits - Dire Straits' self-titled debut, Making Movies/Mark Knopfler's Shangri-La, Love Over Gold/Mark Knopfler's Kill to Get Crimson, Brothers In Arms, Private Investigations: The Best of Dire Straits and Mark Knopfler and The Best of Dire Straits/Get Lucky. All episodes feature interviews with Mark Knopfler.
The Doobie Brothers - Toulouse Street, The Captain and Me (both aforementioned episodes featured interviews with Tom Johnston, Patrick Simmons and John Hartman), Takin' It to the Streets (which featured interviews with Michael McDonald) and Minute by Minute (featured interviews with McDonald, Hartman, Simmons and one comment from Tom Johnston).
The Doors - The Doors' self-titled debut, Strange Days and L.A. Woman. All episodes feature interviews with Ray Manzarek
Eagles - Eagles self-titled debut, Desperado/On the Border and Hotel California. Eagles and Desperado/On the Border feature interviews with Glenn Frey and Randy Meisner while Hotel California featured interviews with Frey plus Joe Walsh and Don Henley.
Emerson, Lake & Palmer - self titled debut/Trilogy (one episode), Brain Salad Surgery and Emerson Lake and Palmer : The Anthology 1970–1998. All feature interviews with Keith Emerson, Greg Lake and Carl Palmer (the latter had a new interview with Palmer talking about the reason for the best of and on the passing of Keith Emerson).
Melissa Etheridge - Yes I Am and The Awakening. Features interviews with Etheridge.
Fleetwood Mac - Fleetwood Mac's White Album, Rumours and Tusk. Features interviews with Stevie Nicks. Lindsey Buckingham was also interviewed for the anniversary editions of Fleetwood Mac's White Album and Rumours plus Tusk. Mick Fleetwood was interviewed for Fleetwood Mac White Album and Rumours.
Foghat - Fool for the City. Includes interviews with Dave Peverett and Rod Price.
Foreigner - Foreigner's self-titled debut, Double Vision and Foreigner 4. All include interviews with Mick Jones and Lou Gramm except Double Vision, which only features Jones (all anniversary editions of Double Vision also had comments from Lou Gramm).
Peter Frampton - Frampton Comes Alive! and Shine On: A Collection (2-part episode). Interviews with Frampton.
Peter Gabriel - So and Us. Features interviews with Peter Gabriel.
The J. Geils Band - Bloodshot and Freeze Frame. Features interviews with Peter Wolf.
Genesis - Duke/Abacab (one episode and subsequently aired as Genesis 1976-1982 as part of the band's induction into The Rock and Roll Hall of Fame in 2010, Genesis 1983-1998 would air the following week), Genesis' self-titled album a/k/a The Mama Album, Invisible Touch, We Can't Dance and R-Kive (the latter would turn into individual episodes for A Trick Of the Tail and Wind and Wuthering. All five episodes feature interviews with Phil Collins and Mike Rutherford. Tony Banks was also interviewed for Genesis' self-titled album and We Can't Dance.
David Gilmour - On an Island and Rattle That Lock. Features interviews with Gilmour and the latter also features Polly Samson.
Grand Funk Railroad - Closer to Home. Features interviews with Mark Farner.
Grateful Dead - The Arista Years, In the Dark and Dead at 50. Features interviews with Bob Weir, Phil Lesh, and Mickey Hart.
Sammy Hagar - Unboxed (later re-aired as The Essential Red Collection and re-aired in 2009 to spotlight his Cosmic Universal Fashion album). Features interviews with Hagar.
George Harrison - Best of Dark Horse 1976–1989 (later re-aired as a 2-part episode Let It Roll: Songs by George Harrison). Features interviews with Harrison.
Heart - Dreamboat Annie, Little Queen/Dog and Butterfly (one episode originally but separate shows for those album's 30th anniversary were produced) and self titled 1985 album. All feature interviews with Ann Wilson and Nancy Wilson.
Jimi Hendrix - Are You Experienced, Electric Ladyland and Live at Woodstock. All featured interviews with The Jimi Hendrix Experience drummer Mitch Mitchell, producer/engineer Eddie Kramer and biographer John McDermott. Bass player Billy Cox was interviewed for Live at Woodstock),
Don Henley - Building the Perfect Beast and The End of the Innocence. Both episodes feature interviews with Henley.
Humble Pie - Performance Rockin' the Fillmore. Features interviews with Peter Frampton and Jerry Shirley.
INXS- Listen Like Thieves and Kick. Features interviews with Andrew Farriss and Kirk Pengilly and archived interviews with Michael Hutchence and Tim Farriss.
James Gang- James Gang Rides Again. Features interviews with Joe Walsh.
Jefferson Airplane - Surrealistic Pillow. Features interviews with Paul Kantner, Marty Balin and Grace Slick
Jethro Tull - Benefit, Aqualung, Thick as a Brick, Songs From The Wood and Living With the Past. All feature interviews with Ian Anderson.
Billy Joel - The Stranger, 52nd Street and Glass Houses. Features interviews with Billy Joel.
Elton John - Goodbye Yellow Brick Road (2-part episode). Features interviews with Elton John & Bernie Taupin.
Journey - Infinity (features interviews with Steve Perry, Gregg Rolie and Neal Schon), Escape (interviews with Perry, Schon and Jonathan Cain), Frontiers (interviews with Perry, Schon and Cain) and Time X 3 (2-part episode) (features interviews with Rolle, Cain, Perry and Schon).
Kansas - Leftoverture (features interviews with Phil Ehart, Steve Walsh and Kerry Livgren. The 30th, 35th and 40th Anniversary episodes also has interviews with Robby Steinhardt and Rich Williams), Point of Know Return (features interviews with Livgren and Ehart. The 30th, 35th and 40th Anniversary Episodes also includes interviews with Walsh, Steinhardt and Williams). Sail On: The 30th Anniversary Collection (2-part episode) (features interviews with Ehart, Livgren, Walsh, Williams and Steinhardt). The Prelude Implicit features interviews with Williams, Ehart, David Ragsdale, Billy Greer and Ronnie Platt.
King Crimson - In the Court of the Crimson King. Featuring interviews with Greg Lake.
The Kinks - The Ultimate Collection, Sleepwalker/Misfits/Low Budget (one episode), The Best of The Kinks, To the Bone (2-part episode) and One For the Road. Features interviews with Ray Davies.
Kiss - Alive!, The Very Best of KISS (2-part episode) and KISS Alive 35!. Features interviews with Gene Simmons and Paul Stanley.
Led Zeppelin - Led Zeppelin, Led Zeppelin II, Led Zeppelin III and Led Zeppelin IV and No Quarter: Jimmy Page and Robert Plant Unledded, Physical Graffiti (2-part), Presence/In Through the Out Door/Coda. All episodes feature interviews with Jimmy Page. Robert Plant also appears on Led Zeppelin's I-IV, Physical Graffiti (Part 2) and No Quarter and John Paul Jones appeared briefly on the 2014 remaster of the first three Led Zeppelin albums.
Huey Lewis and the News - Sports. Features interviews with Lewis.
Little Feat - Waiting For Columbus, Join the Band and The Little Feat Box Set. All feature interviews with Bill Payne and Paul Barrerre.
Loverboy - Get Lucky. Features interviews with Mike Reno and Paul Dean.
Lynyrd Skynyrd - Pronounced Leh-nerd Skin-nerd, Second Helping, One More from the Road, Street Survivors, Thyrty: The 30th Anniversary Collection and The Essential Lynyrd Skynyrd (2-part episode). All episodes have interviews with Gary Rossington. Ed King was also interviewed for the first two titles and Essential. Plus The Essential Lynyrd Skynyrd (which aired in conjunction with band's induction into The Rock and Roll Hall of Fame) also featured interviews with Allen Collins, Johnny Van Zant, Billy Powell and Leon Wilkeson.
Paul McCartney - Flowers in the Dirt, Tripping the Live Fantastic, Back in the U.S., "When I'm Sixty-Four" (a tribute in honor of Paul McCartney's 64th birthday) and Good Evening New York City. Features interviews with McCartney.
Meat Loaf - Bat Out of Hell and The Very Best of Meat Loaf (2-part episode). Features interviews with Meat Loaf.
John Mellencamp - Uh-Huh, The Lonesome Jubilee and Words & Music: John Mellencamp's Greatest Hits. Includes interviews with John Mellencamp.
Men at Work - Business as Usual. Includes interviews with Colin Hay.
Metallica - Metallica a/k/a The Black Album and Load. Includes interviews with James Hetfield and Kirk Hammett.
Steve Miller Band - Fly Like an Eagle, Book of Dreams and Young Hearts - Complete Greatest Hits. All feature interviews with Steve Miller.
Montrose - Montrose self-titled. Features interviews with the late Ronnie Montrose and Sammy Hagar.
The Moody Blues - Days of Future Passed, A Question of Balance, Seventh Sojourn, Time Traveller (2-part episode) and Timeless Flight box set. All episodes feature interviews with Justin Hayward. John Lodge appears on all other episodes and the 50th Anniversary episode of Days of Future Passed. Graeme Edge also appeared on A Question of Balance
Van Morrison - The Warner Bros Years. Includes an interview with Van Morrison (made possible by the BBC).
Mötley Crüe - Girls, Girls, Girls, Dr. Feelgood and Mötley Crüe Greatest Hits. Includes interviews with Vince Neil and Nikki Sixx.
Stevie Nicks - Bella Donna and Crystal Visions - The Very Best of Stevie Nicks. Features interviews with Stevie Nicks.
Ted Nugent - Ted Nugent/Free For All/Cat Scratch Fever (one episode) and Double Live Gonzo!/Live in Sweden. Features interviews with Nugent.
Ozzy Osbourne - Blizzard of Ozz/Diary of a Madman (one episode), No More Tears, Prince of Darkness (2-part episode). All feature interviews with Osbourne.
The Alan Parsons Project - Tales of Mystery and Imagination, I Robot  and The Best of Alan Parsons. All feature interviews with Parsons.
Tom Petty - Damn the Torpedoes, Full Moon Fever and Into the Great Wide Open. All feature interviews with Petty.
Pink Floyd - Meddle (originally Part 1 of the A Foot In the Door : The Best of Pink Floyd special), The Dark Side of the Moon, Wish You Were Here, Animals, The Wall (2-part episode), A Momentary Lapse of Reason, Shine On (2-part episode), The Division Bell (2-part episode initially but aired as a single episode in 2009 and 2014 for its 15th and 20th anniversaries respectively), Echoes (A Tribute to Richard Wright 1943–2008) and The Endless River. All episodes feature interviews with David Gilmour, Nick Mason and Roger Waters while Richard Wright also appears on episodes for Wish You Were Here, A Momentary Lapse of Reason, The Division Bell and Echoes (which was aired as a tribute to Wright after Richard Wright's passing in 2008). Waters however was not interviewed for the albums he was not involved with (A Momentary Lapse of Reason, Shine On, The Division Bell and The Endless River). The first episode of Dark Side of the Moon, which aired in 1988 and 1990, just has interviews with Gilmour. The Immersion Edition episode and all anniversary episodes of DSOTM since its 20th Anniversary in 1993 feature interviews with Gilmour plus Waters and Mason. The initially-aired 2-part episodes of The Wall (1989, 1990, 1994 (15th anniversary) and 1999 (20th anniversary) airings only feature interviews with Waters but as of the 25th anniversary 2-part airing in 2004 (and all future anniversary editions and the 2012 Immersion box set 2-part airing), Gilmour and Mason were also interviewed (the 30th Anniversary episode of The Wall was dedicated to the memories of Rick Wright, longtime Pink Floyd manager Steve O'Rourke and The Wall's orchestrator Michael Kamen). Wish You Were Here was the only episode in where all four members were interviewed.
Robert Plant - Now and Zen and Nine Lives. Features interviews with Plant.
The Police - Outlandos d'Amour/Regatta De Blanc (one episode), Zenyatta Mondatta and Synchronicity. All episodes have interviews with Stewart Copeland whilst Synchronicity episode featured additional interviews with Sting (musician). On all anniversary airings of Zenyatta Mondatta, Ghost in the Machine was also spotlighted and Sting was interviewed on the anniversary episodes of Zenyatta Mondatta and the Outlandos/Regatta episode. Andy Summers was also interviewed on the Outlandos and Regatta episode and on the Zenyatta Mondatta/Ghost in the Machine episode.
The Pretenders - self titled debut, Learning to Crawl and Pirate Radio (2-part episode). Features interviews with Chrissie Hynde.
Queen - A Night at the Opera, News of the World, The Game, Queen 40, Live at the Rainbow '74, Queen Forever and Bohemian Rhapsody: The Original Soundtrack. All episodes feature interviews with Brian May while May is joined by Roger Taylor on A Night at the Opera, The Game, Queen 40, Rainbow '74 and Queen Forever episodes.
Queensrÿche - Empire and Sign of the Times. The latter would be re-aired in 2009 to also spotlight on the group's American Soldier album. Features interviews with Geoff Tate and Chris DeGarmo.
R.E.M. - Document/Green, Out of Time. Features interviews with Michael Stipe, Peter Buck and Mike Mills.
REO Speedwagon- You Can Tune a Piano But You Can't Tuna Fish and Hi Infidelity. Features interviews with Kevin Cronin and Neal Doughty.
The Rolling Stones - Beggars Banquet has interviews with Bill Wyman (later airings also have interviews with Keith Richards and Mick Jagger). Let it Bleed features interviews with Wyman and Mick Taylor. Some Girls and Stripped features interviews with Jagger, Ronnie Wood and Richards.
Todd Rundgren- Something/Anything. Features interviews with Rundgren.
Rush - Moving Pictures, Signals/Grace Under Pressure (one episode), Power Windows/Hold Your Fire (one episode), Permanent Waves/Power Windows (one episode), Counterparts, Grace Under Pressure/Counterparts (one episode), Rush's 35th Anniversary, Rush Sector box sets and the band's induction into The Rock and Roll Hall of Fame. Geddy Lee and Alex Lifeson are interviewed for Moving Pictures, Power Windows/Hold Your Fire and Permanent Waves/Power Windows episodes. Lifeson is interviewed solo for Counterparts. Neil Peart is interviewed for Signals/Grace Under Pressure episode. Lifeson and Peart appeared on Grace Under Pressure/Counterparts episode (which aired for those two albums' 20th and 10th anniversaries respectively in 2004). All three members appeared on Rush 35, Permanent Waves, Rush Sector and Rush Hall of Fame episodes.
Bob Seger - Live Bullet, Night Moves, Stranger in Town, Against the Wind, Nine Tonight, Greatest Hits (2-part episode), Greatest Hits 2 and Ultimate Hits. (2-part episode. All feature interviews with Seger.
Billy Squier - Don't Say No. Features interviews with Squier.
Steely Dan - Can't Buy a Thrill and Aja. All episodes feature interviews with Donald Fagen and Walter Becker.
Al Stewart - Year Of the Cat. Features an interview with Stewart.
Rod Stewart - Every Picture Tells a Story and Time. Features interviews with Rod Stewart.
Styx - The Grand Illusion, Pieces of Eight, Paradise Theatre and The A&M Albums 1975-84. All three episodes feature interviews with Dennis DeYoung and James "J.Y." Young. Tommy Shaw is also interviewed for The Grand Illusion and subsequent Anniversary episodes for Pieces of Eight, Paradise Theatre and The A&M Years.
Supertramp - Crime of the Century and Breakfast in America. Both episodes feature interviews with former member Roger Hodgson.
Talking Heads - Best of Talking Heads (later re-aired as Sand in the Vaseline: Popular Favorites). Features interviews with Jerry Harrison and later airings features interviews with David Byrne.
George Thorogood - George Thorogood and the Destroyers/Move It On Over (one episode) and The Best of George Thorogood and the Destroyers. Features interviews with Thorogood.
Pete Townshend - Coolwalkingsmoothtalkingstraightsmokingfirestoking (re-aired as Pete Townshend: Gold in December 2006 and as the anniversary episodes of Empty Glass in 2010 and 2015). Includes interviews with Townshend.
Traveling Wilburys - Traveling Wilburys Vol. 1. Features interviews with Tom Petty and George Harrison.
Triumph - Just a Game and Allied Forces (re-aired as The Triumph Remasters in 2004 featuring new interviews with Levine and Moore plus Emmett from original episode). Features interviews with Triumph members Gil Moore, Mike Levine and Rik Emmett.
Robin Trower - Bridge of Sighs. Features interviews with Trower.
U2 - War, Rattle and Hum, Achtung Baby and The Best of U2: The 1980s. Features interviews with Bono, The Edge, Larry Mullen and Adam Clayton.
Van Halen - Van Halen features interviews with Alex Van Halen and Michael Anthony (all subsequent anniversary episodes also featured interviews with Eddie Van Halen and David Lee Roth). Van Halen II/Women and Children First/Fair Warning (one episode) and MCMLXXXIV all featured interviews with Anthony and the Van Halen brothers. 5150 features interviews with Sammy Hagar (the anniversary editions also had interviews with Van Halen brothers and Anthony). OU812 and For Unlawful Carnal Knowledge features interviews with Van Halen brothers, Anthony and Hagar. The Best of Both Worlds (2-part episode). All features interviews with the Van Halen brothers and Anthony. Part one also features interviews with David Lee Roth and part two also features interviews with Sammy Hagar.
Stevie Ray Vaughan - The Best of Stevie Ray Vaughan (a tribute to Stevie Ray Vaughan) and In Step. Includes interviews with Chris Layton, Tommy Shannon, Joe Bonamassa, Doyle Brahmall, Buddy Guy, Eric Clapton, Steve Miller (on the 20 Anniversary Tribute to Stevie's death) and archived interviews with Stevie Ray Vaughan.
Joe Walsh - The Smoker You Drink, The Player You Get (all later anniversary episodes also spotlighted his 1978 solo effort But Seriously, Folks...). Includes interviews with Joe Walsh
Whitesnake - Whitesnake 1987 and Whitesnake: The Definitive Collection". Features interviews with David Coverdale.
The Who - Tommy (2-part episode), Live at Leeds, Who's Next, Quadrophenia (2-part episode) and Thirty Years of Maximum R&B (2-part episode, later re-aired as The Ultimate Collection). All episodes feature interviews with Pete Townshend. John Entwistle also was interviewed for Live at Leeds, Who's Next (25th and 30th anniversary airings) and Maximum R & B episodes and Roger Daltrey appeared on the Maximum R & B episode and anniversary episodes of Live at Leeds and Quadrophenia.
Gary Wright - The Dreamweaver. Features interviews with Wright.
Yes - The Yes Album, Fragile, Close to the Edge and 90125. All four episodes feature interviews with Jon Anderson. The Yes Album and 90125 also features interviews with Tony Kaye, Chris Squire and Alan White. Fragile also has interviews with Rick Wakeman. Close to the Edge features Anderson and Wakeman plus Bill Bruford and Steve Howe. The 45th Anniversary of The Yes Album also had comments from Bruford and Howe. 
Neil Young - Harvest and Ragged Glory. Features interviews with Young.
Warren Zevon - Excitable Boy. Features interviews with Zevon.
ZZ Top - Tres Hombres, Eliminator and ZZ Top's Greatest Hits. All three episodes feature interviews with Dusty Hill, Billy Gibbons and Frank Beard.

External links

Redbeard Interview

American music radio programs
1988 radio programme debuts